Alocasia odora (also called night-scented lily, Asian taro or giant upright elephant ear) is a flowering plant native to East and Southeast Asia (Japan, China, Indochina, Assam, Bangladesh, Borneo, Taiwan). In Manipur, local name is Hoomu. Alocasia odora (called Ray) can be used as medicine for the treatment of common cold in North Vietnam.

The plant is actually inedible when raw because of needle-shaped raphides (calcium oxalate crystals) in the plant cells. In Japan, there are several cases of food poisoning by accidental consumption. The Ministry of Health, Labour and Welfare warned not to eat A. odora (Kuwazuimo), which looks similar to edible Colocasia gigantea (Hasuimo) or Colocasia esculenta (Satoimo).

This plant is grows to about 0.5–1.6 m high, with rhizomes of about 4–10 m high and 3–5 cm wide. The leaves are big and blade-shaped, ovate, light green with cordate base. The petioles are 0.3–1.0 m long, with the lower parts clasped around the stem.

The plant is a member of the genus Alocasia, and is thus related to taro.

References

odora
Flora of Asia
Plants described in 1822